National Order of Merit may refer to:
 National Order of Merit (Algeria)
 National Order of Merit (Bhutan)
 National Order of Merit (Brazil)
 National Order of Merit (Ecuador)
 Ordre national du Mérite (France)
 National Order of Merit (Gabon)
 National Order of Merit (Guinea)
 National Order of Merit (Malta)
 National Order of Merit (Mauritania)
 National Order of Merit (Paraguay)
 National Order of Merit (Romania)

See also 

 Order of merit (disambiguation)